Entre nos is a 2009 drama film starring Paola Mendoza. The film, which was co-written and co-directed by Mendoza with Gloria LaMorte, explores the life of Mariana, a Colombian immigrant attempting to survive on the streets of New York City with her two children. The film has been screened at over 14 film festivals, including the Tribeca Film Festival, has won numerous awards, and has garnered generally positive reviews.

Synopsis 
Mariana (Mendoza) is a Colombian immigrant who has recently traveled to New York with her two children, 10-year-old Gabriel (Sebastian Villada Lopez) and 6-year-old Andrea (Laura Montana Cortez) in order to be reunited with her husband Antonio (Andres Munar). However, one day Antonio leaves his family after announcing that he has found work in Miami, and it soon becomes apparent to Mariana that he does not intend to return. Seeing this, she sets out with her children onto the streets of Queens in an attempt to scrape together a decent living. When selling her homemade empanadas fails to bring in any money, Mariana and the children begin collecting aluminum cans off the city's streets. Complications arise, and soon the family finds itself in a desperate day-to-day struggle for survival.

The film is a semi-autobiographical tale based on the arrival of Mendoza's own mother to the United States; however, this fact is not revealed to the audience until a post-film sequence immediately before the credits roll.

Production 
The screenplay for Entre nos took two years to complete. Due to the strict requirements of the roles, LaMorte and Mendoza auditioned over 200 girls for the role of Andrea and over 300 boys for the role of Gabriel before ultimately settling on Cortez and Villada.

The film made its world premiere at the Tribeca Film Festival in 2009, and has since had subsequent screenings both on the festival circuit and in select cinemas in New York and Miami.

Cast

Reception

Awards

Critical reception 
The film received positive reviews from film critics. Review aggregator Rotten Tomatoes reports that 83% of professional critics gave the film a positive review, with a rating average of 7.2/10. A review by Andy Webster of The New York Times said of directors Mendoza and LaMorte that "both are deft with pacing, composition and atmosphere," in addition to claiming that the scenes involving Mariana's children "have charm and authenticity." The New York Post called Mendoza's performance "heart-tugging." David Noh of Film Journal International described the film as "an indictment of this incredibly wealthy country's indifference to the less fortunate," and praised the performances of Villada and Cortez, referring to the two as "miracles of naturalism." Michelle Orange of The Village Voice called the film "strangely resonant" and claimed the directors have a "mitigating eye for destitution." According to a post on Slashfilm, Michael Moore included Entre nos on his list of the 20 best films of 2009, in an email Moore sent to those on his mailing list.

References